The Camp Pinchot Historic District is a U.S. historic district (designated as such on 22 October 1998), located approximately  north of Fort Walton Beach, Florida. The district is on Eglin Air Force Base, roughly along the west bank of Garnier's Bayou. It contains 10 historic buildings.

See also 
 Choctawhatchee National Forest

References

External links
 Okaloosa County listings at National Register of Historic Places
  at 

Geography of Okaloosa County, Florida
Historic districts on the National Register of Historic Places in Florida
National Register of Historic Places in Okaloosa County, Florida
1998 establishments in Florida